Victor Amadeus, Prince of Carignano may refer to:

Victor Amadeus I, Prince of Carignano (1690-1741)
Victor Amadeus II, Prince of Carignano (1743-1780)